State Route 33 (SR 33) is a north–south state highway in the U.S. state of California. It runs north from U.S. Route 101 in Ventura through the Transverse Ranges and the western side of the San Joaquin Valley to Interstate 5 at a point east of Tracy. SR 33 replaced part of U.S. Route 399 in 1964 during the "great renumbering" of routes. In the unincorporated sections of Kern County it is known as the West Side Highway. In addition, the California Legislature designated the entire Kern County portion as the Petroleum Highway in 2004. The southernmost portion in Ventura is a freeway known as the Ojai Freeway, while it is known as the Maricopa Highway from Ojai to Maricopa.

Route description

State Route 33 begins in Ventura as a short freeway ("Ojai Freeway"). SR 33 then continues north as Maricopa Highway, an undivided surface road, through Ojai, following Matilija Canyon past the easternmost extremity of the Santa Ynez Mountains in Los Padres National Forest, and passing over the Transverse Ranges at Pine Mountain Summit. As SR 33 comes down into the Cuyama Valley, it comes up to a  junction with SR 166 east of Cuyama. In Maricopa, Route 33 turns northwest, following the western side of the San Joaquin Valley. Between Taft and Avenal it roughly parallels Interstate 5 and the eastern foothills of the Temblor and Diablo ranges; for the first  of the portion following the axis of the Midway-Sunset Oil Field. Thereafter, it departs due north near Cantua Creek, turns northwest at Mendota, through Firebaugh and meets State Route 152 in Dos Palos, in which it runs concurrently due west for approximately ten miles. It departs again west of Los Banos, turning north to Santa Nella (where it has an interchange with I-5), and roughly parallels I-5 and the San Joaquin River until its northern terminus at I-5 and Bird Road southeast of Tracy.

When passing through the Avenal/Coalinga area travelers pass near a series of prisons and government facilities. They include: Avenal State Prison, Pleasant Valley State Prison, and the Coalinga State Hospital.

In the portions of the route in Kern and Fresno Counties, SR 33 passes through one of the United States' largest petroleum extraction fields, with hundreds of nodding oil pumps along the highway.  Some of the fields visible from the highway include the Midway-Sunset, South and North Belridge, Cymric, McKittrick, Lost Hills, and Coalinga oil fields.

Most of SR 33's route passes through sparsely populated, relatively desolate portions of the San Joaquin Valley. Travelers along it should use caution, since emergency services are typically dozens of miles away. Carrying extra water and coolant is especially advised, since summertime temperatures in the area routinely surpass .

Several segments of this route are part of the California Freeway and Expressway System, but only two segments, one south of the northern city limits of Ojai, and one near SR 152 are part of the National Highway System, a network of highways that are considered essential to the country's economy, defense, and mobility by the Federal Highway Administration. Several segments are eligible to be included in the State Scenic Highway System; however, only the portion from 6.4 miles north of the SR 150 junction to the Ventura–Santa Barbara county line is a scenic highway as designated by Caltrans, meaning that it is a substantial section of highway passing through a "memorable landscape" with no "visual intrusions", where the potential designation has gained popular favor with the community. This scenic segment is also designated as part of the Jacinto Reyes Scenic Byway, a National Forest Scenic Byway.

History

Before the US 399 designation was deleted in 1964, SR 33 followed SR 166 east from US 99 at Wheeler Ridge to Maricopa in lieu of the segment from Ventura to Maricopa, and followed the old US highway from Taft to Maricopa. Today, SR 166 remains on the segment between Wheeler Ridge and Maricopa.

SR 33 used to extend north to Interstate 205 in Tracy, but this segment was relinquished after the segment of Interstate 5 from SR 33 to I-205 was completed.

When Caltrans implemented its exit numbering program in 2002, SR 33's section of the Ojai Freeway was not included and is one of the very few stretches of freeway in California to not feature exit numbers.

Major intersections

See also

References

Further reading
.

External links

California @ AARoads.com - State Route 33
Caltrans: Route 33 highway conditions
California Highways: SR 33

033
033
033
State Route 033
State Route 033
State Route 033
State Route 033
State Route 033
State Route 033
State Route 033
State Route 033
State Route 033
Los Padres National Forest